The Spanish Karate Federation,  is the national body for Karate in Spain. It's the only association authorised to send Spanish Karatekas to the Summer Olympics.

References

External links

Sports organizations established in 1970
Karate in Spain
Karate organizations
Organisations based in Madrid
Sport in Madrid
Sports governing bodies in Spain